Rokitno Szlacheckie  is a village in the administrative district of Gmina Łazy, within Zawiercie County, Silesian Voivodeship, in southern Poland.

References

Rokitno Szlacheckie
Piotrków Governorate
Kielce Voivodeship (1919–1939)